= Ruslan Alisultanov =

Russian businessman and politician (born 1992)

- Born: 6 January 1992 (age 34); Grozny, Russia
- Occupations: businessman, politician

Ruslan Lechievich Alisultanov (Russian: Руслан Лечиевич Алисултанов, born 6 January 1966) is a Russian businessman, manager, politician. Owner of Unimilk LLC, which controls the assets of Health&Nutrition (formerly Danone Russia), chairman of the board of directors of Health&Nutrition. In 2020-2023 - Deputy Minister of Agriculture of the Chechen Republic. Honorary citizen of the village of Itum-Kali and the Itum-Kalinsky district.

== Early life and education ==
Born January 6, 1992, in Grozny, Chechnya.

Graduated from Moscow State University, Faculty of Law. Studied at the Russian Academy of Public Administration.

== Career ==
In 2018–2020, he held the position of Deputy Mayor of Grozny.

In 2020 - Deputy Head of the Administration of the Head and Government of the Chechen Republic.

In November 2020, he was appointed Minister of Agriculture of the Chechen Republic.

In July 2023, he took over as chairman of the Board of Directors of Health&Nutrition (formerly Danone Russia). He became the owner of 1% of Unimilk LLC.

In early December 2024, he became the owner of Unimilk LLC, which controls the assets of Health&Nutrition.

== Personal life ==
Married, has 3 children.
